Daniel H. Lowenstein, M.D., is the Robert B. and Ellinor Aird Professor of Neurology and Executive Vice Chancellor and Provost at the University of California, San Francisco (UCSF). He is known internationally for his work in the field of epilepsy including laboratory-based and clinical research, the clinical care of patients with epilepsy, and advocacy for the needs of patients and family members living with epilepsy. He has had an active role in medical education and in efforts to advance social justice, has held many leadership positions at both UCSF and Harvard Medical School, was the originator of the “Academy of Medical Educators” concept, and is the recipient of numerous teaching awards both at UCSF and nationally. He has served as the Dean for Medical Education at Harvard Medical School, and as President of the American Epilepsy Society. In 2017, he was elected to the National Academy of Medicine in recognition of his many contributions to American medicine.

Education and academic career
Lowenstein graduated with a B.A. in Mathematics from the University of Colorado (1973), obtained an M.S. degree in Man-Environment Relations from Pennsylvania State University (1978), and received his M.D. from Harvard Medical School in 1983. At the University of California, San Francisco (UCSF), he completed an internship in Pediatrics (1983–84), a residency in Neurology (1984–87), a two-year fellowship in Stanley Prusiner's Laboratory, and then became a faculty member at UCSF in the Department of Neurology where, in 1998, he was named the Robert B. and Ellinor Aird Professor of Neurology. While at UCSF, he established the UCSF Epilepsy Research Laboratory, was active at multiple levels within the university, including serving as Co-Chair for the Chancellor's Steering Committee on Diversity, and Chair of the “Blue Sky” Curriculum Design Task Force that helped design the new medical school curriculum.

From 2000 to 2003, Lowenstein served as Dean for Medical Education at Harvard Medical School (HMS). While there, he oversaw a re-organization of curricular governance, the creation of a new educational technology program, and the establishment of the HMS Academy, a novel structure for the support of the school's educational mission. In 2003, he returned to UCSF as Division Chief of the UCSF Epilepsy Center, and Director of the university's physician-scientist training programs. Beginning in 2006, Lowenstein served in numerous leadership roles in the UCSF Clinical and Translational Sciences Institute. In February 2015, Chancellor Sam Hawgood tapped the physician-scientist to be second-in-command as the Executive Vice Chancellor and Provost for the university. In this role, Lowenstein leads UCSF's robust research enterprise and its highly ranked academic program, consisting of four professional schools and a Graduate Division.

Lowenstein has had national leadership roles in professional and governmental organizations related to the fields of neuroscience, neurology and epilepsy. These include: Member of the Advisory Council of the National Institute of Neurological Disorders and Stroke (NINDS), which helps to define scientific policy at the national level; President of the American Epilepsy Society (2003-2004); Chair of the NINDS Epilepsy Benchmarks Oversight Committee (2000-2014); Chair of the International League Against Epilepsy Commission on Genetics (2013-2017).

Awards
Lowenstein has received numerous awards for his research accomplishments and for his medical school teaching, both at UCSF and nationally.

His research awards include:
 The American Epilepsy Society's 2001 Basic Research Award, an honor given each year to the foremost basic science investigator whose research "contributes importantly to understanding and conquering epilepsy." 
 The American Epilepsy Society 2012 Lennox Award, given to "a clinician-scientist who is felt to be among the most outstanding investigators in the field of epilepsy research."
 The International League Against Epilepsy 2013 Ambassador Award "in recognition of outstanding international contributions to the cause of epilepsy."
 The American Neurological Association 2013 Raymond D. Adams Lectureship
 The American Academy of Neurology 2015 N. Houston Merritt Lectureship

His national teaching awards include:
 The American Medical Student Association (AMSA) National Golden Apple for Teaching Excellence Award (1997), which is given to one medical school teacher in the country each year.
 The American Neurological Association (ANA) Distinguished Teacher Award (1997, the first recipient of this award.)
 The Alpha Omega Alpha Robert J. Glaser Distinguished Teacher Award from the Association of American Medical Colleges (1998).

At UCSF, he has received many teaching awards from the 1st and 2nd year medical student classes, awards for which they nominate their faculty each year. In addition, his peers have recognized his accomplishments with additional awards. These include: multiple awards for "A Major Contribution to Teaching", "Outstanding Lecture", "Outstanding Lecture Series", and "An Outstanding Role Model"; the 1992 UCSF Academic Senate Distinction in Teaching Award; the 1993 and 1998 UCSF Kaiser Foundation Award for Excellence in Teaching; the UCSF Class of 1995 John V. Carbone Award for Excellence in Teaching; Faculty Teaching Awards in 1994 and 1996; and the Kaiser Foundation's Lifetime Achievement Award for Excellence in Teaching.

Lowenstein has given the keynote address for graduating medical students at commencement ceremonies at UCSF in 1994, 1996, 1997, 2000, and 2012.

Lowenstein has also advocated for cultural diversity issues at UCSF, for which he received the 1998 Black Student Health Association's Faculty Award, the 1998 UCSF Dr. Martin Luther King, Jr. Award, and the 2006 Holly Smith Award for Exceptional Service to the UCSF School of Medicine. In 2009, he received the Chancellor's Award for Public Service in recognition of his creation and leadership of the Iraq Action Group which sponsored numerous programs to educate the Bay Area community about the health consequences of the Iraq War.

In 2015 Lowenstein received the Chancellor”s Diversity Award for Disability Service as result of his efforts to remove the stigma associated with mental illness among health professions students.

In 2017, Lowenstein was elected to the National Academy of Medicine in recognition of his contributions to epilepsy research, medical education and leadership in academic medicine.

Research
Lowenstein's recent clinical and research interests include the genetic factors thought to underlie many forms of epilepsies (idiopathic epilepsies) and the management and treatment of patients with status epilepticus (unusually prolonged seizures).

His laboratory studies (carried out from 1989 to 2002) have addressed the fundamental mechanisms of neuronal network remodeling that occur during epileptogenesis, the process in which a normal network transforms into a hyperexcitable network capable of producing or relaying seizure activity. The main efforts of his research group focused on the various forms of cellular reorganization that are observed in humans with temporal lobe epilepsy, and the parallels between reorganization in the adult nervous system and normal developmental processes. Important findings by his team included the observation of selective neuronal loss in the setting of traumatic brain injury, the discovery that seizure activity in an adult model of temporal lobe epilepsy causes a marked increase in the birth of hippocampal neurons (with post-doc Jack Parent, MD), and the recognition that numerous molecules responsible for normal development are also expressed in this same brain region in the adult (with post-doc Sam Pleasure, MD, PhD, Robert Elliott, PhD, and others).

In 2002, Lowenstein turned his attention toward questions related to the genetic basis of common forms of human epilepsy. Working with colleagues from throughout the world, he helped create the Epilepsy Phenome/Genome Project (EPGP), an international, multi-institutional, collaborative study that aimed to collect detailed phenotype data on 5,250 subjects with specific forms of epilepsy, with the goal of finding the genetic determinants of their disease through whole exome and whole genome sequencing. EPGP enrolled over 4,000 participants and, at the time, compiled the most extensive and detailed phenotype dataset in the history of epilepsy research. In 2011, Lowenstein and colleagues were successful in receiving funding for a new NINDS Epilepsy Center Without Walls, the “Epi4K: Gene Discovery in 4,000 Epilepsy Genomes” which had as one of its goals the analysis of the EPGP cohorts.

The first major findings of the collaborative effort between EPGP and Epi4K, which demonstrated the role of de novo mutations as the cause of many patients with epileptic encephalopathy, appeared in a 2013 issue of Nature. Numerous findings have since been published based on the combined work of EPGP and Epi4K, including a paper in Lancet Neurology describing the role of ultra-rare variants in the common epilepsies. In addition, Lowenstein has helped oversee the phenotyping efforts of the International League Against Epilepsy (ILAE) Consortium on Complex Epilepsies, which completed a meta-analysis of available genotype data on approximately 15,000 epilepsy patients. He is one of the leaders of Epi25, an international effort that has the ultimate goal of completing whole exome and whole genome sequencing on 25,000 patients with epilepsy in collaboration with the Broad Institute and other partner institutions http://epi-25.org/.

Lowenstein's clinical research related to status epilepticus began with retrospective studies of patients admitted to San Francisco General Hospital, as well as a highly cited article suggesting a revision of the definition of status epilepticus. In the 1990s, he was the Principal Investigator of a prospective, multi-centered, NINDS-sponsored clinical trial looking at the potential benefits of active treatment of patients in status epilepticus in the pre-hospital setting. This five-year study, completed in 1999, helped define the optimal therapy for these patients nationally. From 2005 to 2015, Lowenstein served as Co-Principal Investigator and member of the Neurological Emergency Treatment Trials (NETT) Clinical Coordinating Center, which oversaw a network of academic centers and affiliated hospitals in the U.S. carrying out numerous clinical trials related to acute neurological disease. As part of this effort, he was Co-Principal Investigator with Dr. Robert Silbergleit for the Rapid Anticonvulsant Medications Prior to Arrival Trial (RAMPART) study, where he was involved in the design, oversight and implementation of a trial that unambiguously demonstrated the benefits of the administration of intramuscular midazolam in this setting.

RAMPART was selected as the “2013 Clinical Trial of the Year” by the Society for Clinical Trials. Most recently, working with colleagues in the field, Lowenstein helped in the design and implementation of the Established Status Epilepticus Treatment Trial (ESETT), a NINDS-funded, randomized, prospective study of fos-phenytoin, valproate or levetiracetam in the treatment of status epilepticus.

Other Notable Accomplishments

The Academy:

While chairing the UCSF “Blue Sky” Curriculum Design Task Force in the late 1990s, Lowenstein is credited for coming up with the idea of “The Academy”, an entirely new approach for supporting the teaching mission of medical schools. The Academy provides an alternate mechanism for directing resources toward the support of faculty educators and curricular innovation through the formation of essentially a 'department without walls', with features such as endowed teaching chairs, innovation funding, peer-to-peer teaching observation, and recognition of talented educators throughout the institution. The academy movement now involves over 35 institutions across the U.S.

The Epilepsy Research Benchmarks:

During the first White House-initiated Curing Epilepsy conference held in 2000, Lowenstein suggested that members of the epilepsy research community should attempt to capture the field's current 'state of the art' and define a series of goals for the field that could serve as a research agenda. This led to the adoption by the National Institutes of Neurological Disorders and Stroke (NINDS) of the “Epilepsy Research Benchmarks”, a program that has been led by Lowenstein and used by the NINDS and other funding agencies to help prioritize grant opportunities and demonstrate progress to the legislature and the public at-large.  One of the major impacts of this effort has been an emphasis placed on research into the co-morbidities of epilepsy, an aspect of epilepsy that was previously neglected on the research agenda.

The Last Lecture:

In April 2013, Lowenstein was selected by the students at UCSF to give “The Last Lecture”, where he was asked to respond to the prompt: “If you had but one lecture to give, what would you say?” Lowenstein's hour-long talk to more than 700 members of the campus community, and described by observers as “alternately inspiring, hilarious, and profoundly moving”, was organized into four threads: adventure, passion, justice, and joy and sorrow.

Other Interests:

In addition to his professional activities, Lowenstein is an avid skier and wilderness traveller who has hiked, climbed and canoed extensively throughout the world, including mountaineering and canoe expeditions in Asia, Central and South America, Canada and the United States.

Publications
Lowenstein has published over 175 scholarly professional journal articles that include:

References

External links
 UC San Francisco Faculty Profile
 "Epilepsy: The Sacred Disease" Lecture at UC San Francisco "Mini Medical School for the Public" (October 2007)
 The Last Lecture, UCSF (April 2013)
 Top 5 Lessons Learned from The Last Lecture
 5 Questions with Dr. Daniel Lowenstein
 2012 commencement address at UC San Francisco
 "Medical Education in the Early 21st Century: Caught in a Revolution" David Seegal Alpha Omega Alpha Lecture at Columbia University Medical Center (January 2013)

American neurologists
Living people
University of California, San Francisco faculty
University of Colorado alumni
Pennsylvania State University alumni
Harvard Medical School alumni
UCSF School of Medicine faculty
Year of birth missing (living people)
Members of the National Academy of Medicine